Ulrich Schrade (21 July 1943 in Patricken / East Prussia (now Patryki, Poland) – 15 November 2009 in Warsaw, Poland) was a Polish philosopher, educationist and ethicist. Born in Patryki. 

In the years 1961-1966 he studied economics under Boleslaw Kasprowicz at the Higher School of Economics in Sopot, Poland); from 1966-1969 he worked at the creation of the tire plant in Olsztyn; in the years 1969-1974 he studied philosophy under Bogusław Wolniewicz at the University of Warsaw.

Since 1974 he worked at the Faculty of Management and Social Sciences at the Warsaw University of Technology. At this university he is considered to be the founder of a specific current of philosophy of science and technology and a major contributor to the theory of higher education. Until his death he was holding the following positions:

 Head of the Department of Philosophy
 Head of Pedagogical Seminary
 Head of the Postgraduate Pedagogical Studies at the Warsaw University of Technology.

He was a member of the Disciplinary Commission of the Higher Education Council and board member of the Polish Philosophical Society.

The core of his scientific interests were the general problems of anthropology and axiology and education theory. He was a professor at the Warsaw University of Technology and has also worked as a visiting professor at the Akademia Humanistyczna in Pułtusk (Pultusk Academy of Humanities).

Awards
 Gold Cross of Merit of the Republic of Poland (Złoty Krzyż Zasługi), 2005 
 Medal of the National Education Commission (Medal Komisji Edukacji Narodowej)

Works
 Idea humanizmu w świetle aksjologii Henryka Elzenberga. (The idea of humanism in the light of Henryk Elzenberg's axiology.), 1986
 Etyka. Główne systemy, (Ethics. The major systems), 1992
 Nurty filozofii współczesnej. (Currents of contemporary philosophy), three editions, 1997, 2003, 2010
 Międzywojenna polska myśl narodowa. Od patriotyzmu do globalizmu. (Polish national idea of the interwar period. From patriotism to globalism), 2004
 Dydaktyka szkoły wyższej. Wybrane problemy, (College didactics. Selected Problems), 2010

References

20th-century Polish philosophers
1943 births
2009 deaths
People from East Prussia
Polish people of German descent
Polish ethicists